The 2018 United States Women's Curling Championship was held from March 3 to 10 in Fargo, North Dakota. It was held in conjunction with the 2018 United States Men's Curling Championship. The winning team earned the right to represent the United States at the 2018 Ford World Women's Curling Championship provided that they are also in the top 75 WCT Order of Merit (2 tear period) or have at least 40 points WCT Order of Merit year-to-date ranking as of January 31, 2018.

Teams
Eight teams qualified to participate.

Round-robin standings

Round-robin results
All draw times are listed in Central Standard Time.

Draw 1 
Sunday, March 04, 12:00pm

Draw 2 
Sunday, March 04, 8:00pm

Draw 3 
Monday, March 05, 2:30pm

Draw 4 
Tuesday, March 06, 8:00am

Draw 5 
Tuesday, March 06, 4:00pm

Draw 6 
Wednesday, March 07, 8:00am

Draw 7 
Wednesday, March 07, 4:00pm

Playoffs

Semifinal 
Friday, March 9, 2:00pm

Final 
Saturday, March 10, 12:30pm

References

External links

United States National Curling Championships
Women's curling competitions in the United States
Curling competitions in North Dakota
United States Women's Curling Championship
United States Women's Curling Championship
United States Women's Curling Championship
United States Women's Curling Championship
Sports in Fargo, North Dakota
Women's sports in North Dakota